The Elliot Lake Red Wings are a Canadian Junior "A" ice hockey team based out of Elliot Lake, Ontario.  They are members of the Northern Ontario Junior Hockey League (NOJHL) and play their home games at the Elliot Lake Centennial Arena. The team is owned by a community nonprofit corporation.

History

The Elliot Lake Wildcats were founded in 2014 when the city of Elliot Lake was granted an expansion team just days after the Elliot Lake Bobcats moved to Cochrane, Ontario, to become the Cochrane Crunch.The team chose the Wildcats, over the previous Elliot Lake Vikings moniker that had been for several decades by a previous franchise. Nathan Hewitt, a former junior coach in the Central Canada Hockey League was chosen as the team's first coach.

During their inaugural 2014–15 season, the Wildcats finished second in their division with a 38-11-2-1 regular season record. However, their season was cut short in the semifinals losing 4-games-to-1 to the Soo Thunderbirds.

For their second season in 2015–16, the Wildcats once again finished second in their division, behind only the Soo Thunderbirds. The Wildcats were led offensively by Cole Hepler, who finished seventh in league scoring with 79 points and captain Spencer MacLean, who finished 10th respectively. Hepler also had a league high 22-game point streak during the season. Rookie goaltender Aaron Mackay starred for the team in net, finishing third in the league with 21 wins. The Wildcats eliminated the Rayside-Balfour Canadians in five games in the first round, before falling once again to the Thunderbirds in the Division Finals 4-games-to-1. The Wildcats would win the 2016 TEP Showcase Hockey Tournament with a 3–2 double overtime win over the Markham Royals on June 26. They finished with an 8–0 record, and conceded a tournament low five goals.

On July 28, 2016, the Wildcats announced that head coach Nathan Hewitt accepted a coaching job with a university in the CIS and Corey Bricknell was named the second head coach in team history. The Wildcats finished the 2016–17 season in fifth place in the NOJHL West Division going 23–26–4–3. Forward David Elford would lead the team in points with 42, while goaltender Matt Kostiw lead the team in wins with 13. In the playoffs, the Wildcats lost to the Soo Eagles in the divisional play-in series 2-games-to-1.

The 2017–18 season saw the Wildcats ending up in 5th place in the West Division, with a 25–27–4 record. Jacob Kelly was the team's leading scorer, with 34 goals and 36 assists, for a total of 70 points. The Wildcats lost in the divisional play in series for the second straight season, this time to Northshore rival the Blind River Beavers in 2 straight games.

The 2018–19 season saw head coach Corey Bricknell step down to take a head coaching job in Hungary and was replaced by assistant coach Trevor Ritchie. The team finished with a 21–32–1–2 record. Just before the end of the regular season, the local civic centre in Elliot Lake saw its roof collapse, which saw the City of Elliot Lake close Centennial Arena and force the Wildcats to play their remaining home games in Blind River.

The 2019–20 season brought it in a new head coach in Gord Ouimet, but there was still uncertainty that was Centennial Arena was going to be ready in time after the roof of the arena of the 53-year-old building was replaced. The Wildcats got off to slow start and never recovered, on December 6, 2019, Gord Ouimet was let go as head coach and was replaced by Taureen White. The team ended up in last place, with a 7–46–3 record.

On May 8, 2020, Elliot Lake Wildcats announced they would take a one-year leave from the NOJHL for the 2020–21 season. On April 16, 2021, the team was rebranded as the Elliot Lake Red Wings as well as new management with John Buchanan as general manager and Brian Noad as head coach. Noad stepped down as head coach before coaching a game and former Wildcat player Tanner Bowditch was named head coach on September 19, 2021.

Season-by-season records

References

External links
Elliot Lake Red Wings webpage

Ice hockey teams in Ontario
Sport in Northern Ontario
2014 establishments in Ontario
Ice hockey clubs established in 2014